Ernest in the Army is a 1998 American direct-to-video comedy film directed by John Cherry and starring Jim Varney. It is the tenth and final film to feature the character of Ernest P. Worrell before Varney's death in February 2000. In this film, Ernest joins the Army because he wants to drive large vehicles, but ends up being sent into combat. It was shot in Cape Town, South Africa's Koeberg Nature Reserve. John Cherry's son, Josh portrayed Corporal Davis.

Plot synopsis
Ernest is working as a golf ball collector at a golf range in Valdosta, Georgia, but fantasizes about being a war hero. A friend tells him that if he joins the Army, he will get to drive large vehicles and never have to go into actual combat. He enlists in the reserves, but one day a UN peacekeeping commander Pierre Gullet and the British ambassador visit Ernest's camp and demands that the entire unit including him is to be deployed to the fictional Middle Eastern country of Karifistan, where he and his fellow soldiers have to assist UN troops in the hope of saving the country from being invaded by an evil Islamic dictator named Tufuti of Aziria. Once he began, Ernest and his team investigates a dictator who was responsible for the wars in the nearby village. Suddenly, he finds a lost boy and has to keep him safe until his father is found.

Cast
 Jim Varney  as Private Ernest P. Worrell / Army Captain / Arab On Quicksand
 Hayley Tyson as Cindy Swanson
 David Muller as Colonel Bradley Pierre Gullet, UN Peacekeeping Commander
 Christo Davids as Ben-Ali, Lost Boy In Desert
 Jeff Pillars as General Rodney Lincoln (as Jeff Pillars)
 Duke Ernsberger as Barnes, General's Aide
 Ivan Lucas as President Almar Habib Tufuti
 John Cherry as Sergeant Ben "Sarge" Kovsky
 Josh Cherry as Corporal Davis

Home media
This film had its first DVD release from First Look Studios on October 1, 2002. It included the extra feature Your World As I See It. Mill Creek Entertainment re-released both this film and its Bonus Feature along with Knowhutimean? Hey Vern, It's My Family Album as part of the Maximum Ernest and Essential Ernest Collection DVD box sets on October 31, 2006. Image Entertainment re-released Ernest in the Army along with Ernest Rides Again, Ernest's Greatest Hits: Volume 1 and Ernest's Greatest Hits: Volume 2 as the four-disc set Ernest's Wacky Adventures: Volume 1 on June 5, 2012. Image Entertainment re-released this film as part of Ernest Triple Feature on October 1, 2013 along with Ernest Goes to School and Ernest Goes to Africa and for the third time on January 12, 2016 as part of the two-disc set Ultimate Ernest Collection.

External links
 

1998 films
1998 direct-to-video films
1998 comedy films
Direct-to-video comedy films
Ernest P. Worrell films
Films directed by John R. Cherry III
Films set in a fictional country
Films shot in South Africa
American children's comedy films
1990s English-language films
1990s American films